Ali Kazemaini (born in Tehran, Iran) is a retired Iranian-American soccer forward and former men's head coach at Cleveland State.  He spent eight seasons in the Major Indoor Soccer League and one in the National Professional Soccer League, earning 1985 MISL Rookie of the Year honors.

Youth
Born in Tehran, Iran, Kazemaini moved to the United States to attend Orange High School in Orange County, California.  He graduated from Orange High School in 1980 and entered Cleveland State University that fall.  While at Cleveland State, he played on both the school’s soccer and tennis teams.  In June 1983, the U.S. government discovered that he had allowed his student visa to lapse in January 1979, thus placing him in the country illegally.  He subsequently reapplied for a visa as well as U.S. citizenship.  Kazemaini played for the Vikings from 1980 to 1983.  He finished his career ranked fifth on the career goals list with 41, sixth in points with 102 and ninth in assists with 20. He was a second team All American in 1981 and 1983.  In addition to soccer, Kazemaini played on the school's tennis team in 1982 and 1983.

Following his collegiate career, Kazemaini was selected for the 1984 U.S. Olympic soccer team.  However, he had not yet received his citizenship before the games began and was dropped from the team.

Professional
In 1983, Kazemaini was drafted by both the Cleveland Force of Major Indoor Soccer League and the San Diego Sockers of the North American Soccer League.   He signed with the Force, earning Rookie of the Year honors for the 1984–1985 season.  When the Force folded following the 1987–1988 season, he moved to the Tacoma Stars.  At some point, he moved to the Baltimore Blast, playing for them during at least the 1991–1992 season.  Both MISL and the Blast folded at the end of the season, and Kazemaini moved to the Canton Invaders of the National Professional Soccer League for the 1992–1993 season, after having appeared for the North York Rockets in the outdoor Canadian Soccer League. He retired from playing professionally in 1993.

Coach
In 1992, John Carroll University hired Kazemaini as head coach.  Over fourteen seasons, his team won seven Ohio Athletic Conference regular season titles and four post-season tournament titles and compiled a 177–61–13 record.  On December 15, 2005, Kazemaini moved to Cleveland State.

In 2005, Kazemaini coached the Cleveland Soccer Academy in the USL Super Y-League.

References

External links
 Cleveland State coaching profile
 MISL stats

1963 births
Living people
American soccer coaches
American soccer players
Baltimore Blast (1980–1992) players
Canton Invaders players
Cleveland Crunch players
John Carroll University
Cleveland Force (original MISL) players
Cleveland State Vikings men's soccer coaches
Cleveland State Vikings men's soccer players
Iranian emigrants to the United States
Major Indoor Soccer League (1978–1992) players
National Professional Soccer League (1984–2001) players
Tacoma Stars players
Association football forwards
North York Rockets players